Una Vez Más (Spanish: "Once More") may refer to:

Una Vez Más, a 1995 album by the Barrio Boyzz
"Una Vez Más" (The Barrio Boyzz song), the lead single from the album
"Una Vez Más" (Leslie Shaw song), a single by Leslie Shaw
 Una Vez Más (Calle Ciega album), a 2006 album by Venezuelan group Calle Ciega
"Una Vez Más", a 1982 song by Juan Gabriel
"Una Vez Más", a 2014 song by Víctor Manuelle
 Una Vez Más Holdings, LLC, a broadcasting company in the United States